Agyneta galapagosensis is a species of sheet weaver found in the Galápagos Islands and Brazil. It was described by Baert in 1990.

References

galapagosensis
Endemic fauna of the Galápagos Islands
Spiders of South America
Spiders described in 1990